Gerhard Mauz (November 29, 1925 in Tübingen – August 15, 2003 in Reinbek) was a German journalist and correspondent for judicial processes.

Mauz was the son of T4-Gutachter Friedrich Mauz (1900-1979). He studied psychology, psychopathology and philosophy; he began his career at Die Welt. From 1964 till his retirement 1990 he was a member of the staff of Der Spiegel. He wrote about legal proceedings in post-war Germany.

In 1973 he received the Bundesverdienstkreuz am Bande (Order of Merit of the Federal Republic of Germany).

Publications
Die großen Prozesse der Bundesrepublik Deutschland. Springe: zu Klampen 2005, .
Die Justiz vor Gericht: Macht und Ohnmacht der Richter. C. Bertelsmann, 1990. .

References

External links

1925 births
People from Tübingen
2003 deaths
German male journalists
Recipients of the Cross of the Order of Merit of the Federal Republic of Germany
German male writers
Der Spiegel people
20th-century German journalists